Suzzanna: Bernapas dalam Kubur (Suzzanna: Buried Alive) is a 2018 Indonesian horror film directed by Rocky Soraya and Anggy Umbara and written by Bene Dion Raja Gukguk. It is a remake to the 1981 film titled Sundelbolong directed by Sisworo Gautama Putra.

Plot
In the spring of 1989, Satria, director of a cable manufacturing factory, and his wife Suzzanna are eagerly expecting their first child. At his plant, Satria invokes the chagrin of two of his workers, Umar and Jonal, who have been demanding wage raises. When Satria leaves for a business trip to Japan, Umar and Jonal conspire with two other dissatisfied co-workers, Dudun and Gino, to raid Satria's house. Suzzanna, who was watching a film outside, returns amid their burglary, and when they make noise, she investigates. Fighting the burglars panickedly, she ends unmasking them, and in another attempt to fight back, she is accidentally impaled on a sharp bamboo pole. Believing her dead, the culprits begin burying her, but are shocked to discover that she is still alive. Unwilling to go to prison, they nevertheless continue filling her grave, burying her alive.

Suzzanna awakens inside her house and realizes that she to her shock has become a sundel bolong. When Satria returns shortly afterwards, Suzzanna, though torn by sadness, leaves him oblivious. However the house servants eventually discover her nature, and Suzzanna lets them flee the mansion. Seeking revenge, Suzzanna begins stalking her slayers one by one, starting with Dudun, whom she lures from his work dormitory into the factory to decapitate him. Umar, Jonal and Gino seek out the services of Gino's witch doctor uncle Mbah Turu, who declares that while it is taboo for a sundel bolong to directly kill someone, she can scare or trick them into making them kill themselves or each other. When Suzzanna haunts Jonal, he begins stabbing her, only to find that she has deceived him with an illusion into killing Gino. Umar, Jonal and Turu devises a plan to trap and exorcise her by destroying her home and killing her husband, since it is her love for him that keeps her spirit on Earth. After hearing village gossip about Suzzanna's hauntings, Satria is made fully aware of Suzzanna's condition when he reads from the Quran and she cries out in pain, as well as when he finds and unearths her body, but the same night Umar and Jonal lead a mob of villagers to the house, burning it.

Jonal and Turu incapacitate Suzzanna by driving a kris into her head, then lure Satria into Turu's abode for the final stage of the exorcism, claiming that Suzzanna has been possessed by a demon. However, when Jonal tries to kill him, Satria realizes that this is really his wife, murdered by these men, and releases her. While Jonal and Turu flee into the woods, Satria fights and kills Umar, but is stabbed in the back. Suzzanna chases down Turu, blinding him and causing him to impale his head on a pointed tree branch, and then kills Jonal by burying him alive. By personally slaying a human, Suzzanna's ties to the Earth are severed, and she dies in Satria's arms after they exchange sorrowful goodbyes. Soon, however, Satria discovers that his wound is fatal, and he dies as well, rejoining his wife in the afterlife.

Cast 
 Luna Maya as Suzzanna
 Herjunot Ali as Satria
 Teuku Rifnu Wikana as Umar
 Verdi Solaiman as Jonal
 Kiki Narendra as Gino
 Alex Abbad as Dudun
 Asri Welas as Mia
 Opie Kumis as Pak Rojali
 Ence Bagus as Tohir
 Norman R. Akyuwen as Mbah Turu
 Clift Sangra as Pak Bekti

Accolades

References

External links 
 
 
 

2018 films
2018 horror films
Indonesian dark fantasy films
2010s Indonesian-language films
2018 fantasy films
Remakes of Indonesian films